This is a list of spaceflights launched between January and June 1961. For launches between July and December, see 1961 in spaceflight (July–December). For an overview of the whole year, see 1961 in spaceflight.

Launches

|colspan=8 style="background:white;"|

January
|-

|colspan=8 style="background:white;"|

February
|-

|colspan=8 style="background:white;"|

March
|-

|colspan=8 style="background:white;"|

April
|-

|colspan=8 style="background:white;"|

May
|-

|colspan=8 style="background:white;"|

June
|-

|}

References

Footnotes

(January-June), 1961 in Spaceflight
Spaceflight by year